Mitteldithmarschen is an Amt ("collective municipality") in the district of Dithmarschen, in Schleswig-Holstein, Germany. Its seat is in Meldorf. It was formed on 25 May 2008 from the former Ämter Kirchspielslandgemeinde Albersdorf, Kirchspielslandgemeinde Meldorf-Land and the town Meldorf.

The Amt Mitteldithmarschen consists of the following municipalities (with population in 2005):

References

Ämter in Schleswig-Holstein